is an autobahn in southwestern Germany. It connects the city of Trier to the autobahn A 1.

Exit list 

 

  
|}

External links 

602
A602